Sarah Victoria Hainsworth  (born 5 October 1967 in Leeds) is Pro-Vice-Chancellor (Research) at the University of Bath. Previously she was Pro-Vice-Chancellor and Executive Dean of the School of Engineering and Applied Science at Aston University, Professor of Materials and Forensic Engineering, and Head of the Department of Engineering, at the University of Leicester.

Education 
Hainsworth studied at Richmond School. She was later educated at the University of Newcastle where she was awarded BEng and PhD degrees.

Career 

Hainsworth came to public attention for her analysis of the wounds found on the skeleton of Richard III.  This related the tool marks to possible weapons. Her work has also included engineering a safe drinking glass by examining how the design and manufacture of glasses influences the way in which they fracture.  She has also done research on automotive materials, is Director of the Advanced Microscopy Centre and heads the Materials Technology Integration Centre (MaTIC).  In 2016 she succeeded Professor Helen Atkinson  as Head of the Department of Engineering at the University of Leicester. She has acted as an expert witness and actively encourages young women to take up engineering as a career. From 2017, Hainsworth worked at Aston University as their Pro-Vice-Chancellor and Executive Dean of the School of Engineering and Applied Science. Hainsworth joined the University of Bath as Pro-Vice-Chancellor (Research) in December 2021.

Awards and honours 
Hainsworth was awarded the Institution of Mechanical Engineers Tribology Bronze Medal in 1995, the Rosenhain Medal of the Institute of Materials, Minerals, and Mining in 2008, and was nominated as one of the Women's Engineering Society's Outstanding Technical Women in 2009.  In 2015, she received the American Academy of Forensic Sciences Engineering Sciences Section Andrew H. Payne Jr. Special Achievement Award in recognition of her contributions to forensic engineering sciences. In 2016 she was elected to the Royal Academy of Engineering. She was awarded an OBE in the 2019 New Year Honours for services to engineering and to forensic science.

References

External links

1967 births
Living people
People from Leeds
Alumni of Newcastle University
Academics of Aston University
Academics of the University of Bath
British women engineers
Fellows of the Royal Academy of Engineering
Female Fellows of the Royal Academy of Engineering
Officers of the Order of the British Empire
21st-century women engineers
Engineers from Yorkshire